Alloa Ferry station was the terminus on the Stirling and Dunfermline Railway (S&DR) Alloa Harbour branch line that ran from . It opened on 3 June 1851, running down the east side of Glasshouse Loan to  short of the ferry pier. The end of the branch was described in a local newspaper as where "an extensive goods shed has been erected and a comically diminutive station house has been put up".

The line closed on 28 February 1968 when the goods service to the harbour was withdrawn.

References

Former North British Railway stations
Railway stations in Great Britain opened in 1851
Railway stations in Great Britain closed in 1852